The 1977 NCAA Division I baseball tournament was played at the end of the 1977 NCAA Division I baseball season to determine the national champion of college baseball.  The tournament concluded with eight teams competing in the College World Series, a double-elimination tournament in its thirty first year.  Eight regional competitions were held to determine the participants in the final event.  Seven regions held a four team, double-elimination tournament while one region included six teams, resulting in 34 teams participating in the tournament at the conclusion of their regular season, and in some cases, after a conference tournament.  The thirty-first tournament's champion was Arizona State, coached by Jim Brock.  The Most Outstanding Player was Bob Horner of Arizona State.

Regionals
The opening rounds of the tournament were played across eight regional sites across the country, seven consisting of four teams and one of six teams. The winners of each Regional advanced to the College World Series.

Bold indicates winner.

Atlantic Regional at Columbia, SC
{{4Team2ElimBracket

| RD1-seed1=
| RD1-team1=
| RD1-score1=6
| RD1-seed2=
| RD1-team2=| RD1-score2=3

| RD1-seed3=
| RD1-team3=| RD1-score3=7| RD1-seed4=
| RD1-team4=South Carolina
| RD1-score4=6

| RD1-seed5=
| RD1-team5=East Carolina
| RD1-score5=1
| RD1-seed6=
| RD1-team6=South Carolina| RD1-score6=4

| RD2-seed1=
| RD2-team1=Wake Forest| RD2-score1=9| RD2-seed2=
| RD2-team2=South Alabama
| RD2-score2=6

| RD2-seed3=
| RD2-team3=South Alabama
| RD2-score3=2
| RD2-seed4=
| RD2-team4=South Carolina| RD2-score4=11| RD3-seed1=
| RD3-team1=Wake Forest
| RD3-score1-1=2
| RD3-score1-2=1
| RD3-seed2=
| RD3-team2=South Carolina| RD3-score2-1=5| RD3-score2-2=6}}

Mideast Regional at Minneapolis, MN

Midwest Regional at Norman, OK

Northeast Regional at Storrs, CT

Rocky Mountain Regional at Tempe, AZ

South Regional at Coral Gables, FL

South Central Regional at Arlington, TX

West Regional at Honolulu, HI

College World Series

Participants

Results

Bracket

Game results

All-Tournament Team
The following players were members of the All-Tournament Team.

Notable players
 Arizona State: Jamie Allen, Chris Bando, Hubie Brooks, Bob Horner, Dave Hudgens, Darrell Jackson, Chris Nyman, Bob Pate, Rick Peters, Patt Rooney, Thomas Hawk
 Baylor: Andy Beene, Jaime Cocanower, Fritzie Connally, Steve Macko
 Cal State Los Angeles: Darrell Brown, Alfredo Esparza
 Clemson: Ron Musselman, Bill Schroeder, Brian Snyder
 Minnesota: Brian Denman, Paul Molitor, Jerry Ujdur
 South Carolina: Jim Lewis, Ed Lynch, Randy Martz, Mookie Wilson
 Southern Illinois: Neil Fiala, Rickey Keeton, Bill Lyons, Dewey Robinson, George Vukovich
 Temple:''' Pete Filson

See also
 1977 NCAA Division II baseball tournament
 1977 NCAA Division III baseball tournament
 1977 NAIA World Series

References

NCAA Division I Baseball Championship
1977 NCAA Division I baseball season
Baseball in the Dallas–Fort Worth metroplex